5 viudas sueltas (English title: Five Widows Loose) is a Colombian telenovela produced and broadcast by Caracol Televisión, with co-production of Sony Pictures Television, starring Coraima Torres, Angélica Blandón, Heidy Bermúdez, Luly Bossa, Andrea Gómez, Diego Cadavid, Ricardo Leguizamo, Ernesto Benjumea and Rodolfo Valdez. It premiered on Caracol Televisión on May 27, 2013 and concluded on January 10, 2014.

Cast 
 Coraima Torres as Virginia Mazuera
 Heidy Bermúdez as Yidis León
 Angélica Blandón as Luisa Bustos
 Luly Bossa as Samantha Palacio
 Andrea Gómez as Marianela Campuzano
 Diego Cadavid as Robin Ruíz
 Ernesto Benjumea as Benjamin Ferreira
 Ricardo Leguízamo as Jacobo Arias
 Andoni Ferreño as Dr. Melguizo
 Rodolfo Valdéz as Marcelo Ríos
 Claudia Moreno as Leticia "Lety"
 César Mora as Luis
 Armando Gutiérrez as Lobo Guerrero
 Carlos Duplat as Pedro Juan Mazuera
 Noelle Schonwald as Patricia Nieto
 Adriana Silva as Carminia
 Patricia Polanco as Vilma
 Ana Medina as Zaira
 Víctor Gómez as the engineer
 Juan Carlos Messier as Ernesto
 Andrés Martínez as Gato
 Jorge López as Mauro
 Carlota Llano as Aminta
 Luz Stella Luengas as Betty
 Roberto Marín as Feliciano
 Ana Maria Jaraba as Elsa Bustos
 Juanita Arias as Mia
 Claudio Cataño as Walter
 Santiago Gómez as Jeronimo
 Katherine Miranda as Carlota
 Ramsés Ramos as Pirateque
 Javier Gardeazábal as Jairo
 Marcela Posada as Alejandra
 Isabella Pineda as Katherin
 Juan Manuel Acosta as Arturo
 Aura Helena Prada as Angela María
 Ricardo Velez as Juan
 Irene Arias as Susana
 Aco Perez as Guardia Castillo
 Fernando Lara as Investigator #1
 Fernando Arango as Investigator #2
 Lorena Mcallister as Maritza
 Catalina Acosta as Adriana
 Francisco Perez as Guardia Rodriguez
 Paola Montoya as Claudia
 Giselle Saouda as Angela
 Pedro Mogollón as the broken lawyer
 Jorge Bautista as Guardia Montoya
 Víctor Cifuentes as Zamudio
 Cesar Alvarez as Albeiro
 Fernando Villate as Maximo
 David Velez as Giovanny
 Ernesto Ballen as Prado
 Andres Martinez as Mauricio
 Martha Suarez as La Mona
 Carlos Vergara as El Zorro
 Rosalba Penagos as Carmen
 Julio Correal as Hernan
 Juan Morales as Anibal
 Juan Pablo Manzanera as Tomas
 Alex Gil as Wilmar
 Carlos Congote as Moreno
 Ilja Rosendahl as Banquero
 Silvio Plaza
 Margarita Reyes

References

External links 
 

2013 telenovelas
2013 Colombian television series debuts
2014 Colombian television series endings
Caracol Televisión telenovelas
Sony Pictures Television telenovelas
Colombian telenovelas
Spanish-language telenovelas
Television shows set in Bogotá